P. Chitran Namboodirippad is a writer, educationist and leading social activist in Kerala, India. He is a National Award-winning educationist and also a mountain man who trekked in the Himalayas for the 29th time even at his age of 99. Namboodirippad was honoured by Justice P. Sathasivam, governor of kerala on the occasion of 99th birthday of him.

Personal life
Chitran Namboodirippad is born in an aristocratic Namboodiri illam, Pakaravoor Mana, Mookkuthala, Malappuram, on 6 January 1920.

Career
Namboodiripad was attracted to Communism while doing his Intermediate course from the St Thomas College, Thrissur. Prominent Communist thinker and leader K Damoradan baptised him to Communism. after his post graduation from Pachaiyappa's College, Chennai, he established a school in a 5-acre plot at his native place, 'Mookkuthala' in 1947 and after 10 years, he handed over the school to the Kerala government for a token amount of rs 1.

Book 
He has published a travelogue Punyahimalayam in  2007 about the travel of Himalayas and autobiography Smaranakalide Poomukham.

References

External links
 School History
 പി ചിത്രൻ നമ്പൂതിരിപ്പാട്-വനിത
 പി ചിത്രൻ നമ്പൂതിരിപ്പാട് നൂറിന്റെ നിറവിലേക്ക‌്- Desabjimani daily
 ഔന്നത്യത്തിന്റെ ചിത്രങ്ങൾ -Mathrubhoomi daily

Writers from Kerala
Activists from Kerala